The Chief of Staff (COS) is an appointed executive branch official in the Government of Rivers State, Nigeria, responsible for coordinating the operations of the Governor's office as well as assisting the Chief Executive in the management of affairs of the government. The Chief of Staff oversees members of the Executive Council and serves as the Governor's liaison with the state executive branch.

Other responsibilities include preparation of the Governor's daily schedule, organisation of meetings, arbitration of disputes, and regulation of gubernatorial access.

List of Chiefs of Staff

References

 
Chief of Staff
Office of the Governor of Rivers State
Political chiefs of staff